Jatun Urqu (Quechua jatun big, urqu mountain, "big mountain", also spelled Jatun Orkho) is a mountain in the Bolivian Andes which reaches a height of approximately . It is located in the Cochabamba Department, Esteban Arce Province, Sacabamba Municipality, northeast of Sacabamba. It lies southwest of Inka Pirqa and Tunari.

References 

Mountains of Cochabamba Department